Delirium's Mistress (1986) is a fantasy novel by British writer Tanith Lee, the fourth book in her series Tales From The Flat Earth.

Plot summary
During the demon's age, when the planet was still flat, Azhriaz, daughter of Azhrarn, Demon Lord of the Night and a mortal, was hidden on an isle surrounded by mist and her spirit was protected to live forever in dreams. But Azhriaz's destiny is about to change unexpectedly. Her powerful energy and beauty attracted Azhrarn’s enemy, Prince Chuz, who created a spell to free Azhriaz from her confinement and convert her into the Delirium’s Mistress.

References

1986 British novels
1986 fantasy novels
Novels by Tanith Lee
DAW Books books